Daan Olivier (born 24 November 1992 in Oegstgeest) is a Dutch former cyclist, who rode professionally between 2014 and 2019 for the   and  squads. He competed at one Grand Tour, the 2017 Vuelta a España.

He was forced to retire for a second time in 2019 due to a knee injury.

Major results

2010
 2nd Overall Liège–La Gleize
1st Stage 2 (TTT)
 2nd Overall Grand Prix Rüebliland
 7th Overall Driedaagse van Axel
2011
 3rd Ronde van Limburg
 8th Overall Tour du Gévaudan Languedoc-Roussillon
 8th Grand Prix des Marbriers
 10th Overall Istrian Spring Trophy
 10th Overall Rhône-Alpes Isère Tour
2012
 2nd Overall Tour de Gironde
 3rd Road race, National Under-23 Road Championships
 3rd Overall Tour de Bretagne
1st  Young rider classification
 4th Overall Tour de l'Ain
1st  Young rider classification
 5th Overall Thüringen Rundfahrt der U23
1st  Young rider classification
1st Stage 1 (TTT)
 8th Overall Tour Alsace
 8th Overall Tour de l'Avenir
 8th Liège–Bastogne–Liège Espoirs
 10th Overall Istrian Spring Trophy
 10th Overall Volta ao Alentejo
2013
 2nd Paris–Tours Espoirs
 4th Sluitingsprijs Zwevezele
2014
 8th Overall Vuelta a Burgos
1st  Young rider classification

Grand Tour general classification results timeline

References

External links

1992 births
Living people
Dutch male cyclists
UCI Road World Championships cyclists for the Netherlands
People from Oegstgeest
Cyclists from South Holland
20th-century Dutch people
21st-century Dutch people